Diego de Sarmiento, O.Cart. (died 30 May 1547) was a Roman Catholic prelate who served as Bishop of Santiago de Cuba (1536–1544).

Biography
Diego de Sarmiento was born in Burgos, Spain and ordained a priest in the Carthusian Order.
On 20 October 1535, he was appointed during the papacy of Pope Paul III as Bishop of Santiago de Cuba. In 1536, he was consecrated bishop. He served as Bishop of Santiago de Cuba until his resignation in 1544. He died on 30 May 1547 in Sevilla, Spain.

References

External links and additional sources
 (for Chronology of Bishops)  
 (for Chronology of Bishops) 

16th-century Roman Catholic bishops in Cuba
Bishops appointed by Pope Paul III
People from Burgos
1547 deaths
Carthusian bishops
Roman Catholic bishops of Santiago de Cuba